is a railway station on the Senmō Main Line in Koshimizu, Hokkaido, Japan, operated by the Hokkaido Railway Company (JR Hokkaido).

Lines
Genseikaen Station is served by the Senmō Main Line, and is numbered B75.

External links
 JR Hokkaido Genseikaen Station information 

Stations of Hokkaido Railway Company
Railway stations in Hokkaido Prefecture
Railway stations in Japan opened in 1987